The 1990 college football season may refer to:

 1990 NCAA Division I-A football season
 1990 NCAA Division I-AA football season
 1990 NCAA Division II football season
 1990 NCAA Division III football season
 1990 NAIA Division I football season
 1990 NAIA Division II football season